Alcohol in Bangladesh is regulated and restricted in Bangladesh. Bangladesh has one of the lowest alcohol consumption rates in Asia according to a World Bank report that came out in 2015.

History
The first distillery was setup in what is today Bangladesh in 1887 by an Englishman named Robert Russell Carew. The company was called Carew & Co (Bangladesh) Ltd and it was nationalised by the government of Bangladesh in 1973. The distillery is part of the Darsana Sugar Mill owned by the state owned enterprise Bangladesh Sugar and Food Industries Corporation. It is the only sugar out of 15 state-owned mills that make a profit due to the distillery. The distillery produces rum, brandy, gin and whisky.

In 2003 the government of Bangladesh gave Jamuna Distillery Limited of Jamuna Group the licence to produce alcoholic beverages. Jamuna Distillery Limited was the first private company to be given licence to produce alcohol which ended the monopoly of the state owned Carew & Co (Bangladesh) Ltd. Alcohol is sold in 5 star hotels and government licensed bars. In 2009 Jamuna launched Hunter branded beer in Bangladesh.

Law
Under Bangladeshi law, any beverage containing more than 0.5% alcohol is considered an alcoholic beverage. A government permit is necessary for selling, storing and the transport of alcohol. To drink alcohol in Bangladesh, one must have a legal permit, which is almost always given to non-Muslims. Muslims will need a medical prescription to obtain an alcohol permit. The prescription must be given by an associate professor of the medical college or a civil surgeon. Foreigners do not need a permit to drink inside licensed bars.

References

 
Bangladesh
Alcohol abuse
Social issues in Bangladesh